Standards is the fourth album led by jazz pianist and mathematician Rob Schneiderman, released on the Reservoir label in 1993.

Reception 

In his review on AllMusic, Ken Dryden stated "Rob Schneiderman has made a series of recordings for Reservoir in addition to being a jazz educator and math professor (the latter career well after this 1992 session). With bassist Rufus Reid and drummer Ben Riley providing a veteran rhythm section, the pianist focuses on standards, including more than a few that had fallen by the wayside by the 1990s. Schneiderman's exuberant take of Vincent Young's showcases both Reid and Riley's tasty brushwork. The pianist opens "So in Love" unaccompanied then switches gears into a breezy post-bop setting suggestive of the late James Williams, who like Reid and Schneiderman both taught at William Paterson University. The leader's deliberate setting of "I Should Care" emphasizes its melancholy mood, seasoned with his rich chord voicings. The leader adds a playful bop vamp in his waltzing treatment of "Fly Me to the Moon." The South American ballad "Disritmia" may not yet be a standard in North America, but Schneiderman's sensuous arrangement help it fit right in with the bevy of decades-old standards on this fine date."

Track listing 
All compositions by Rob Schneiderman except where noted
 "Love Letters" (Edward Heyman, Victor Young) - 7:38
 "So in Love" (Cole Porter) - 8:19
 "Slow Boat to China" (Frank Loesser) - 5:13
 "Without a Song" (Edward Eliscu, Billy Rose, Vincent Youmans)  - 8:55
 "I Should Care" (Sammy Cahn, Axel Stordahl, Paul Weston)  - 5:15
 "Fly Me to the Moon" (Bart Howard) - 6:05
 "Disritmia" - 7:29
 "With a Song in My Heart" (Lorenz Hart, Richard Rodgers) - 6:06
 "When You Wish Upon a Star" (Leigh Harline, Ned Washington) - 4:45
 "No One Else But You" (Don Redman) - 4:47

Personnel 
 Bass – Rufus Reid
 Drums – Ben Riley
 Piano – Rob Schneiderman
 Producer – Mark Feldman
 Recorded by Rudy Van Gelder

References 

Rob Schneiderman albums
1993 albums
Reservoir Records albums
Albums recorded at Van Gelder Studio